Highway 18 is a short main vehicle route in the Cowichan Valley Regional District on Vancouver Island, connecting the city of Duncan on the Trans-Canada Highway with the community of Lake Cowichan, on the shore of Cowichan Lake. The highway first opened to vehicle traffic in 1953, and was re-routed to a straighter and wider alignment in 1970.

In late 2006, drivers using Highway 18 experienced broken parts (such as windows with big shatter marks) on their cars, most of these came from loose rocks after passing other drivers. This generated anger and was called the "Sealcoat Job" because of the bad gravel sealcoating of the stretch to Duncan from the Cowichan Lake Road junction at Lake Cowichan by the new highway contractor company.

In early 2004, a proposal was brought forward to extend Highway 18 west from Lake Cowichan, all the way along existing logging roads to the community of Port Renfrew on the southwest coast of Vancouver Island, as a way of rerouting traffic from the northern part of the Island to Victoria in case of a bad accident or any other extraordinary event forcing a closure of the Malahat. The highway between Mesachie Lake and Port Renfrew is known as the Pacific Marine Circle Route.

References

018
Duncan, British Columbia
Transport on Vancouver Island